is a Japanese former international table tennis player.

Table tennis career
He won a silver medal in the Swaythling Cup (men's team event) at the a 1961 World Table Tennis Championships.

Personal life
His son is Hiroshi Shibutani and they became the first father and son to win the All-Japan Singles title.

See also
 List of table tennis players
 List of World Table Tennis Championships medalists

References

Japanese male table tennis players
World Table Tennis Championships medalists
Year of birth missing (living people)
Living people
Place of birth missing (living people)